Primitivo E. Viray Jr., S.J. is a former President of Ateneo de Naga University and the current Provincial Superior of the Society of Jesus in the Philippines.

He was educated at Sacred Heart School – Ateneo de Cebu, Ateneo de Manila University, University of the Philippines Diliman, and completed his PhD in Development Studies at the University of East Anglia in 2003, entitled "A study of the impact of the Tibod microcredit organisation in Gingoog, Philippines".

References

Alumni of the University of East Anglia
Year of birth missing (living people)
Living people
People from Naga, Camarines Sur
Ateneo de Manila University alumni
University of the Philippines Diliman alumni